Todd Hignite is the author of the books In the Studio: Visits with Contemporary Cartoonists (Yale University Press, 2006) and The Art of Jaime Hernandez/The Secrets of Life and Death (Abrams ComicArts, 2010). He is also the founder and editor of the publication Comic Art (2002–2007) and a curator of  gallery exhibits of comic book and contemporary art, including the traveling retrospective R. Crumb's Underground (organized by the Yerba Buena Center for the Arts); Speak: Nine Cartoonists; Art Chantry: Pearls are a Nuisance; and Lucas Samaras: Fabric Reconstruction Paintings, among others.

External links
Interview with Tom Spurgeon

American male non-fiction writers
Comics critics
Living people
Year of birth missing (living people)